U.S. Route 40 (US 40) is a part of the U.S. Highway System that travels from Silver Summit, Utah, to Atlantic City, New Jersey. In the U.S. state of Colorado, US 40 is a major east–west route. It crosses the Rocky Mountains, passing over the Continental Divide at Berthoud Pass before descending to the Front Range. It then traverses through the Denver Metro Area, then exits by following Interstate 70 (I-70) and US 287. It is concurrent with US 287 for about 145 miles to Kit Carson. US 40 exits into Kansas east of Arapahoe in Cheyenne. At a length of almost 500 miles, US 40 is the longest numbered route in the state.

Route description

Entering Colorado to the south of Dinosaur National Monument, US 40 runs east through the small town of Dinosaur along Brontosaurus Boulevard. The route continues a generally easterly course though Moffat and Routt counties, passing through several small communities along the way. It generally follows the course of the Yampa River. US 40 becomes Lincoln Avenue as it runs through historic downtown Steamboat Springs, Colorado.

Taking a circuitous route through Rabbit Ears Pass, Muddy Pass and Berthoud Pass (crossing the Continental Divide each time) it descends the escarpment along the eastern edge of the Rocky Mountains. Just to the east of Empire, it merges with I-70 for the first time. US 40 and I-70 will run concurrently numerous times across the U.S. The route leaves I-70 at exit 244, to the east of Idaho Springs and rejoins it again at between exits 252 and 254 in El Rancho. It parallels I-70, mostly as a frontage road, until the intersection with former State Highway 26 (SH 26) to the south of Golden

Beginning in Golden, US 40 becomes Colfax Avenue, the main east–west thoroughfare through the Denver-Aurora Metropolitan Area. Along with US 40, the entire route along Colfax Avenue is cosigned as Business Loop 70. The route travels northeast through Golden, then turns due east to travel through Lakewood, Denver, and Aurora. Among the sights to be seen along US 40 is Lake Steam Bath, once the location of a thriving health industry centered on tuberculosis sanatoriums. Also along Colfax Avenue in Denver is the Denver branch of the United States Mint, which produces 50 million coins per day. US 40 rejoins I-70 at exit 288, just to the east of Aurora.

At exit 359 in Limon, US 40 leaves I-70 along Main Street, which it shares with Business Loop 70, US 24, US 287, and SH 71. US 40/US 287 continues to the southeast to the town of Kit Carson. From there, it leaves US 287 and continues east through the towns of Cheyenne Wells and Arapahoe before entering the state of Kansas.

Major intersections

State Highway 40

State Highway 40 (SH 40) represents the former two-lane alignment of US 40 in Arapahoe and Elbert Counties, prior to its demotion by the then-Colorado Department of Highways when they moved the route to then new I-70 in 1968.

SH 40 begins in Arapahoe County the town of Byers at a junction with SH 36 (N Main Street/Old Highway 36), just across the railroad tracks from downtown. It heads southeast to leave Byers and travel along the flat plains of eastern Colorado for the next several miles. The highway passes through the tiny community of Peoria, where there is an interchange with I-70/US 40/US 287 (exit 322), before passing by the Richmil Ranch Open Space park.

SH 40 then enters the town of Deer Trail, passing along the western edge of town as 1st Avenue as it has an intersection with I-70 BS (Cedar Street). It continues southeastward across the plains to leave Deer Trail and cross in Elbert County. The highway passes through the tiny community of Lowland, where it has another interchange with I-70/US 40/US 287 (exit 336), before crossing a creek to enter the small town of Agate along 1st Avenue, with SH 40 coming to an end shortly thereafter at a junction with Main Street.

The entire length of SH 40 is a rural, two-lane, state highway, running parallel to both the eastbound lanes of modern I-70 to its north, as well as a railroad track to its south. SH 40 never goes beyond a half mile from the Interstate.

See also
Victory Highway

References

External links

 Colorado
40
Transportation in Moffat County, Colorado
Transportation in Routt County, Colorado
Transportation in Grand County, Colorado
Transportation in Jackson County, Colorado
Transportation in Clear Creek County, Colorado
Transportation in Jefferson County, Colorado
Transportation in Denver
Transportation in Adams County, Colorado
Transportation in Arapahoe County, Colorado
Transportation in Elbert County, Colorado
Transportation in Lincoln County, Colorado
Transportation in Cheyenne County, Colorado